Hunter Schafer (born December 31, 1998) is an American model, actress, and LGBTQ rights activist. For her activism against the HB2, Teen Vogue listed Schafer on its "21 Under 21" list in 2017. She made her acting debut as transgender high school student Jules Vaughn in the HBO teen drama television series Euphoria (2019–present), which earned her critical praise and nominations for a Shorty Award, an MTV Movie & TV Award, and a Dorian Award. She provided the voice of popular high school student Ruka Watanabe in the English dub of the anime film Belle (2021) and will portray Tigris Snow in the film The Hunger Games: The Ballad of Songbirds and Snakes (2023).

Early life
Schafer was born in Trenton, New Jersey, on December 31, 1998 to parents Katy and Mac Schafer. Her father is a Presbyterian minister, and their family moved between churches and congregations in New Jersey, Arizona, and finally Raleigh, North Carolina. She has three younger siblings: two sisters and a brother.

While in high school, Schafer protested against the North Carolina Public Facilities Privacy & Security Act. On April 21, 2016, while she was a high school junior, Schafer was added as a plaintiff in the Carcaño v. McCrory lawsuit against the bill. In her senior year, Schafer was a semifinalist in the U.S. Presidential Scholars Program. She graduated from the High School Visual Arts program at the North Carolina School of the Arts in 2017, having transferred there from Needham B. Broughton High School. 

Schafer planned to attend Central Saint Martins, an arts college in London, England, but deferred her enrollment after high school to focus on her career.

Career
For her activism, including her fight against HB2, Teen Vogue listed Schafer on its "21 Under 21" list in 2017, and granted her an interview with Hillary Clinton.

Schafer has modeled for Prada, Dior, Gucci, Calvin Klein, Rick Owens, Helmut Lang, Tommy Hilfiger, Thierry Mugler, Coach, Maison Margiela, Vera Wang, Marc Jacobs, Versus Versace, Emilio Pucci, Ann Demeulemeester, and Erdem, among other fashion houses.

In 2019, Schafer was cast in the HBO series Euphoria, marking her acting debut. She received praise for her performance in the series, and the Primetime Emmy Awards came under fire for omitting her from the nominations along with other transgender actors. Aside from her leading role in the series, she also co-wrote an episode with the show's creator Sam Levinson and served as co-executive producer. Additionally, she collaborated with him so that her character and the show's story reflected her experience.

In June 2020, in honor of the 50th anniversary of the first LGBTQ Pride parade, Queerty named Schafer among the 50 heroes "leading the nation toward equality, acceptance, and dignity for all people". In 2021, Time named her to its Next list of "100 emerging leaders who are shaping the future", with a tribute written by Euphoria co-star Zendaya.

Personal life
Schafer is a trans woman. In an interview, she said that the Internet helped her cope with her gender identity, as she turned to YouTube and social media to learn about people's transition timelines. She transitioned after being diagnosed with dysphoria in ninth grade. She has stated, "I do like people to know that I'm not a cis girl because that's not something that I am or feel like I am. I'm proud to be a trans person." In 2019, Schafer said that she was "closer to what you might call a lesbian." In December 2021, she stated on Twitter that her sexuality is "bi or pan or something." As of February 2022, Schafer is dating Euphoria co-star Dominic Fike.

In August 2022, Schafer liked and commented "!!!!!" on an Instagram post that blamed non-binary people who "fought to have trans identities no longer considered a medical condition that requires dysphoria" for negative social attitudes and legislation targeting the trans community. This prompted backlash from queer and trans fans, with many accusing Schafer of endorsing transmedicalism. Commenting on a later Instagram post, Schafer denied being a transmedicalist or holding hatred towards non-binary people, saying that she merely felt there was "an in-balance [sic] in the visibility and space-taken up between non-binary folks and binary trans women (particularly those of color and/or those who have resulted [sic] to sex work as a means of survival) that i think deserves attention/ re-evaluation (as far as resources and platforms go) within the LGBTQ+ community,".

Filmography

Awards and nominations

References

External links
 

1998 births
20th-century LGBT people
21st-century American actresses
21st-century American LGBT people
Actors from Trenton, New Jersey
Actors from Raleigh, North Carolina
Actresses from North Carolina
Age controversies
Bisexual actresses
Female models from North Carolina
LGBT people from New Jersey
LGBT people from North Carolina
American LGBT rights activists
Living people
Needham B. Broughton High School alumni
Transgender actresses
Transgender female models
University of North Carolina School of the Arts alumni